The Concorde Contemporary Music Ensemble (often simply Concorde), founded in 1976, is an Irish contemporary music ensemble. The group's purpose is stated as "[promoting] new music on a regular basis." It has released three full length albums and has gone on several international tours through Europe and North America. The group debuted in the American Embassy in Dublin. It is supported by the Arts Council of Ireland and the Arts Council of Northern Ireland. Concorde also promotes an annual series at the Hugh Lane Municipal Gallery in Dublin, which has been running for over 20 years.

Performers
Jane O'Leary - director, pianist
Madeleine Staunton - flute, alto flute, piccolo
Paul Roe - clarinet, bass clarinet
Elaine Clark - violin
David James - cello
Tine Verbeke - vocals
Richard O'Donnell - percussionist
Dermot Dunne - accordion

Discography
1997 - Celtic Connections
2000 - Containers, Galway Arts Festival 2000
2006 - Contemporary Music from Ireland
rational option insanity
Contemporary Music from Ireland
Contemporary Music from Ireland

External links
 http://homepage.eircom.net/~concorde/ Concorde website
 http://www.concorde.ie/ Concorde website

Irish musical groups
Contemporary classical music ensembles
Musical groups established in 1976
1976 establishments in Ireland